The Big Green Egg, Inc is an American privately held producer and manufacturer of kamado-style ceramic charcoal barbecue cookers and related accessories. The company is primarily known for producing The Big Green Egg, a line of various kamado grills identified by their egg-shape and distinctive dark green color.

The Big Green Egg is made of 18 gauge stainless steel and can hold up to six eggs at one time.

The Big Green Egg has a temperature control that can allow you to cook eggs at temperatures between 100 to 260 degrees. The temperature range is adjustable by turning the knob on top of your smoker, which allows you to choose whether or not you would like your egg whites cooked through, but still soft inside. This will ensure that both sides are cooked evenly and done just right for your liking!

History 

The Big Green Egg Company was founded in 1974 by Ed Fisher and is based in Atlanta, Georgia in the United States. Production of the Big Green Egg takes place in Monterrey, Mexico, by the company Daltile.
Big Green Egg routinely hosts an annual barbeque festival in the outskirts of Atlanta, Georgia, called Eggtoberfest. The 25th Eggtoberfest was celebrated in 2022 and drew more than 3,000 participants.

Design 
The shape of the Big Green Egg is designed to contain the heat by using two draft doors, one at the bottom and another at the top. The bottom draft door slides horizontally creating more or less air flow. This works in conjunction with the top draft door, that swivels left and right, creating more or less updraft, and in turn adjusting the temperature used in the cook. The Big Green Egg is manufactured from ceramics designed to reflect heat, and the temperature gauge recommends not exceeding a maximum temperature of 750 degrees F.
 
The Big Green Egg is a charcoal barbecue: the manufacturers recommend lump wood charcoal because alternatives such as charcoal briquettes generate much more ash, and contain many additives that can contaminate the flavor of the food.

Big Green Eggs can be used for smoking or grilling and with the addition of accessories can bake bread or cook a pizza.

Sizes  
Big Green Eggs are manufactured in seven sizes.

Common accessories 
ConvEGGtor - a ceramic insert designed to facilitate cooking with indirect heat.
Pizza stone - a ceramic insert to help cook pizza, cookies, or bread.
EGG Nest - a metal frame to support the egg, with wheels for easier transportation.

Motorsports 
Big Green Egg sponsored NASCAR Xfinity Series driver #39 Ryan Sieg driving for RSS Racing at Chicagoland Speedway in 2014 and 2019.

In 2022 NASCAR Xfinity Series driver Anthony Alfredo won the Big Green Egg 150.

See also 
 Brustolina
 Hibachi
 Shichirin

References

External links 
 

American companies established in 1974
Manufacturing companies based in Atlanta
Kitchenware brands